Providence often refers to:
 Providentia, the divine personification of foresight in ancient Roman religion
 Divine providence, divinely ordained events and outcomes in Christianity
 Providence, Rhode Island, the capital of Rhode Island in the United States

Providence may also refer to:

Entertainment

Film and television
 Providence (1977 film), a French/Swiss film directed by Alain Resnais
 Providence (2023 film), an American mystery comedy
 Providence (American TV series), a 1999–2002 NBC television series
 Providence (Canadian TV series), a 2005–2011 Radio-Canada television series
 Providence (The X-Files), a 2002 episode of the television series The X-Files
 Providence (Agents of S.H.I.E.L.D.), a 2014 episode of American TV series Agents of S.H.I.E.L.D.
 Providence, a government organization in the show Generator Rex
 HMS Providence, a Royal Navy warship from the 2011 film Pirates of the Caribbean: On Stranger Tides

Music
 Providence (album), a 2009 album by Callisto
 Providence (band), a 1970s American band
 "Providence", a song by Deerhunter from the album Cryptograms
 "Providence", a song by Dreadful Shadows from the album Buried Again
 "Providence", a song by Foals from the album Holy Fire
 "Providence", a song by Godspeed You! Black Emperor from the album F♯ A♯ ∞
 "Providence", a song by King Crimson from the album Red
 "Providence", a song by Sonic Youth from the album Daydream Nation
 "Providence", a song by Tremonti from the album Cauterize
 "Providence", a song by Ulver from the album Wars of the Roses
 "Providence", a song by Withered Hand from Good News

Literature
Providence (Kepnes novel), a 2018 novel by Caroline Kepnes
Providence (Barry novel), a 2020 novel by Max Barry
Providence (Avatar Press), a 2015 graphic novel by Alan Moore and Jacen Burrows

Places 
 Providence, French Guiana
 Providence, Guyana
 Providence (Charleroi Metro), a railway station in Belgium
 Providence Atoll in the Republic of Seychelles
 Providence Township (disambiguation)
 Fort Providence, Northwest Territories, Canada
 New Providence (disambiguation)

United States 
 Providence, Alabama, a town in Marengo County
 Providence, Arkansas, in White County
 Providence, Nevada County, California
 Providence, San Bernardino County, California
 Providence, Illinois, in Bureau County
 Providence, Indiana
 Providence, Kentucky, a city in Webster County
 Providence, Simpson County, Kentucky, an unincorporated community
 Providence, Trimble County, Kentucky, an unincorporated community
 Annapolis, Maryland, formerly Providence
 Providence, Cecil County, Maryland
 Providence, Minnesota, an unincorporated community
 Providence Township, Lac qui Parle County, Minnesota
 Providence, Boone County, Missouri
 Providence, Dunklin County, Missouri
 Providence, New York
 Providence, Caswell County, North Carolina
 Providence, Granville County, North Carolina
 Providence, McDowell County, North Carolina
 Providence, Rockingham County, North Carolina
 Providence, Ohio
 Providence, Rhode Island, in Providence County
 Providence, South Carolina, in Orangeburg County
 Providence, Texas
 Providence, Utah
 Providence, West Virginia

Schools
 Providence Christian Academy (Lilburn, Georgia)
 Providence Christian College
 Providence College, Providence, Rhode Island
 Providence Freemen, athletic teams of Providence University College and Theological Seminary
 Providence Friars, athletic teams of Providence College
 Providence University College and Theological Seminary, in Manitoba, Canada
 Providence University, Shalu District, Taichung City, Taiwan
 University of Providence, Great Falls, Montana

Ships 
 Providence (1812 ship), a merchant convict ship that transported convicts to Australia and was wrecked in 1828
 Providence (1866), an American sidewheel steamer
 Providence (East Indiaman), four ships
 USS Providence, five U.S. Navy ships
 HMS Providence (1791), a Royal Navy vessel
 Providence (ship), several ships

Other uses 
 Eye of Providence, a symbol depicting an eye in a triangle
 Providence (Marvel Comics), a fictional island
 Providence (religious movement), a Christian religious movement
 Providence, a shadow organisation and primary antagonist of the Hitman franchise
 Providence Healthcare (disambiguation)
 Providence (restaurant), a Michelin-starred restaurant in Hollywood, California.

See also 
 
New Providence (disambiguation)